The southern coastal plain blackwater river floodplain forest is a forest system found in Alabama, Mississippi, Florida, and Georgia. These forests occur in the drainages of blackwater rivers and streams whose dark water is caused by high levels of tannins, particulates, and other materials accumulated as they drain through swamps and marshes. The water has little mineral sediment and few suspended clay particles. 

Typical trees of these forests include bald cypress (Taxodium distichum), water tupelo (Nyssa aquatica), swamp tupelo (Nyssa biflora), sweetbay (Magnolia virginiana), and Atlantic white cedar (Chamaecyparis thyoides). Common shrubs are buckwheat tree (Cliftonia monophylla) and swamp cyrilla (Cyrilla racemiflora). Netted chain fern (Lorinseria areolata) is also found here.

References

Plant communities of Alabama
Plant communities of Mississippi
Plant communities of Florida
Plant communities of Georgia (U.S. state)
Forests of Alabama
Forests of Florida
Forests of Georgia (U.S. state)
Forests of Mississippi
Gulf Coast of the United States